Turnpike Lane is a street in Haringey, north London.

Description

Turnpike Lane forms part of the A504 route, running roughly east–west for less than one mile.

The road is characterised by independent retailers with flats above the shops. It is also a local transport hub: Turnpike Lane Underground station and Turnpike Lane bus station are both situated near the eastern end of the street.

A small park named Ducketts Common is situated at the eastern end of the road, opposite the Underground and bus stations. It was once an area of common land where people had the right to graze their animals.

Turnpike Lane is a busy cosmopolitan shopping street and an important traffic thoroughfare. Speciality shops remain open until late at night, and there are a number of restaurants.

The name Turnpike Lane is also used to refer more generally to the area at the southern end of Wood Green High Road and its surroundings.

Nearby places

 Crouch End
 Harringay
 Hornsey
 West Green
 Wood Green

Popular culture 
 The Bus Driver's Prayer
 Mark Knopfler's song "Junkie Doll"
Razorlight's song "Los Angeles Waltz"

References

Streets in the London Borough of Haringey
Transport in the London Borough of Haringey